The Aromanians in North Macedonia, also known as the Vlachs, are an officially recognised minority group of North Macedonia numbering some 9,695 people according to the 2002 census. They are concentrated in Kruševo, Štip, Bitola and Skopje.

Ethnonyms
The Aromanians are known as Vlachs in North Macedonia. To refer to themselves, the Aromanians may use Armčnji, Armānji, Aromani or Arominu, meaning "Roman".

They are also known as Macedo-Romanians by the Romanians, or simply Macedonian Vlachs or just Vlachs in English.

History
The Aromanians are a unique ethno-linguistic group, having their own culture and language, who have existed for over two thousand years in the Balkan peninsula.  They were for centuries considered a traditional mountain people and soon the word Vlach became synonymous with animal-husbandry and herdsmanship throughout the Balkans. Although traditionally live-stock herders many began to emigrate to larger cities in the 16th and 17th centuries. Many Aromanians who fled from Moscopole and the nearby mountainous Gramos region also helped develop Kruševo (Crushuva) and Bitola (Bituli, Bitule) into large prosperous cities. Shepherds of the Pelister region near Bitola used to herd huge flocks of sheep from the summer pastures on Pelister (Pilister) to the winter lowlands near Ghevgelia,  Giannitsa and Salonica (Sãruna). Typical Aromanian goods were cheese, meat, wool and wool garments, leather, rugs and carpets. Many Aromanians also entered the rug and carpet trade by selling kilimi and flocati. A part of Aromanians adhered to the Bogomil faith around the 10th and 11th centuries and contributed to the spread of Bogomilism in Herzegovina  Wealthier Aromanians established themselves in Bitola and Štip (Shtip) as inn-keepers, artisans, caravan traders and merchants. An Aromanian market (Macedonian: Vlaška čaršija) was established in Bitola's Aromanian quarter. The Aromanian presence is still present in Bitola to this day.

The Macedonian-Aromanian mountain villages of Magarevo (Magaruva, Mãgãreva), Gopeš (Gopish, Gopeshi), and Trnovo were founded on the foot hills of Mount Pilister. By the 1860s many Aromanians had joined the agitation present in Macedonia and supported the Macedonian Revolutionary movement. Many Aromanians had also identified with Romanians or Greeks and some even Bulgarians. The first Romanian school was established in 1864 in the village of Trnovo by the Aromanian Dimitri Atanasescu and was followed by another 40 Romanian language-Aromanian schools. Many of these schools provided an education in both the Romanian and Aromanian languages. In the late 19th century a split between the Grecophile and Romanophile Aromanians occurred. This struggle became violent with schools burnt down, cemeteries desecrated and people assaulted. The Aromanian people participated in the Ilinden Uprising and the establishment of the Kruševo Republic. The Kruševo Republic is hailed by Aromanians as the Ten Days of Freedom. Another notable Aromanian who participated was the heroic Pitu Guli who was killed on the Mečkin Kamen (Bear's Rock). 

After the First Balkan War most of the Romanian schools were closed down. Many of the Aromanian villages were destroyed during World War I. To escape the conflict many Aromanians fled to Greece or Romania. Aromanians who lived in what is now known as North Macedonia were subject to strict Serbianization along with the rest of the population. After the outbreak of World War II  most Aromanians once again found themselves subject to Bulgarian control. Many Aromanians joined the Communist Partisans.

After the war many Aromanians began to assert their ethnic identity. High levels of intermarriage with Macedonians and urbanization also began to affect the community. In the 1970s new initiatives were started to create Aromanian social and cultural societies. The Society of Arts and Culture was established in 1979 and in 1981 another cultural society was established. In 1985 the first Aromanian song was recorded by Risto Pulevski-Kicha. A tape was made for Macedonian television and this tape was used to support the request to create a cultural society. The Pitu Guli society of Skopje and the Manaki Brothers Society of Bitola were founded.

After the Declaration of Independence from Yugoslavia, Aromanians were officially recognised as a minority group. They receive full minority rights from the Macedonian government. Currently, the Aromanians have two political parties on North Macedonia, the Democratic Union of the Vlachs of Macedonia (DSVM) and the Party of the Vlachs of Macedonia (PVM). Both have little political importance and have no seats in the Parliament of North Macedonia. The only other Aromanian political party apart of these two is the Alliance for Equality and European Justice (ABDE) in Albania.

Minority status 

The Aromanians are an officially recognised minority group in North Macedonia under the name "Vlachs". The Aromanian language is taught among Aromanian students and the language is co-official in the Krusevo municipality. Aromanian-language media is available, and regular television and radio broadcasts in the Aromanian language help to ensure its survival. The Aromanian National Day is officially celebrated in North Macedonia on May 23. The Aromanians are represented in the political life of North Macedonia through two parties.

Culture
The Aromanian National Day is celebrated on May 23.

Language
Aromanians have traditionally spoken the Aromanian language. Use of this language has recently been in a period of decline. High rates of intermarriage with Macedonians and assimilation have reduced the number of speakers.  The Kruševo municipality is the only place in the world where the Aromanian language is a recognised minority language. The language has recently undergone a revival and is now taught to Aromanian students throughout the country. While 8,714 individuals declared Aromanian ethnicity in the 2021 census, only 3,151 declared Aromanian to be their mother tongue.

Media

Many forms of Aromanian-language media have been established since the 1990s. The Macedonian Government provides financial assistance to Aromanian-language newspapers and radio stations.  Aromanian-language newspapers such as Phoenix service the Aromanian community. The Aromanian television program Spark broadcasts on the second channel of the Macedonian Radio-Television.

Historical censuses

1900 census

Notable people

 Dimitri Atanasescu (1836–1907) - educator
 Constantin Belimace (1848–1932) - Aromanian writer
 Leon Boga (1886–1974) - historian
 Kaliopi Bukle (1966– ) - pop singer; half Aromanian
 Petre Čašule (1882–1924) - revolutionary
 Taki Fiti (1950– ) - Minister of Finance, 1996-1998
 Pitu Guli (1865–1903) - Ilinden revolutionary
 Taki Hrisik (1920–1983) - composer and musician
 Constantin Iotzu (1884–1962) - architect
 Patriarch Joachim III of Constantinople (1834–1912) - patriarch, of Aromanian parents
 Teodor Kapidan (1879–1953) - linguist and academic
 Niku Karanika (1910–2002) - Aromanian poet
 Hari Kostov (1959– ) - Minister of Internal Affairs, 2002-2004; prime minister of Macedonia, May–November 2004
 Jani Makraduli (1965– ) - politician in the Republic of Macedonia
 Milton Manakis (1878–1954) - cinemagraphic pioneer; with Yannakis Manakis, the first people to film the Balkans
 Yannakis Manakis (1882–1964) - cinemagraphic pioneer; with Milton Manakis, the first people to film the Balkans
 Apostol Margarit (1832–1903) - educator
 Miho Mihajlovski (1915-2003) - Macedonian revolutionary
 Ștefan Mihăileanu (1859-1900) - Aromanian nationalist
 Atanasios Piteon (1836–1913) - revolutionary
 Cincar-Janko (1779–1833) - Serbian revolutionary
 Toše Proeski (1981–2007)  - pop singer
 Alexandros Svolos (1892–1956) - Greek politician

See also
 Aromanians in Albania
 Aromanians in Bulgaria
 Aromanians in Greece
 Aromanians in Romania
 Aromanians in Serbia

References

Bibliography
 
 
 
 
 
 
 
 
 

 
Ethnic groups in North Macedonia